Harold Sanderson Wilkinson (20 March 1926 - March 2017) was an English professional footballer who played as a wing half. He played in the Football League for Exeter City and Colchester United before moving into non-league football.

References

External links
 
 Harry Wilkinson at Colchester United Archive Database

1926 births
2017 deaths
Footballers from Sunderland
English footballers
Association football defenders
Chelsea F.C. players
Exeter City F.C. players
Colchester United F.C. players
Folkestone F.C. players
English Football League players